Peripatus brolemanni is a species of velvet worm in the Peripatidae family. Females of this species have 30 to 33 pairs of legs; males have 29. Females range from 39 mm to 65 mm in length, whereas males range from 27 mm to 28 mm. The type locality is in Venezuela.

References

Onychophorans of tropical America
Onychophoran species
Animals described in 1899